Senator Birdsall may refer to:

John Birdsall (politician, born 1802) (1802–1839), New York State Senate
John Birdsall (politician, born 1840) (1840–1891), New York State Senate

See also
Regina Birdsell (born c. 1956), New Hampshire Senate